Cheops' Law is an adage or epigram that is typically stated as, Nothing ever gets built on schedule or within budget.

Written by Robert A. Heinlein; attributed to his fictitious character Lazarus Long in Time Enough for Love (1973) and later in The Notebooks Of Lazarus Long.

See also
 Hofstadter's law: "It always takes longer than you expect, even when you take into account Hofstadter's Law."

References

Adages
Robert A. Heinlein